Charles Wayne "Tinker" Owens is a former professional American football player who played wide receiver for four seasons for the New Orleans Saints (1976, 1978–1980) in the National Football League (NFL).  The younger brother of Heisman Trophy winner Steve Owens, Tinker was a two-time All-American (1974, 1975) during his college career at Oklahoma.

References

1954 births
Living people
People from Miami, Oklahoma
American football wide receivers
Oklahoma Sooners football players
New Orleans Saints players